Robert Lingen Burton (born 20 April 1943) is a Trinidadian born English former cricketer.  Burton was a right-handed batsman who bowled right-arm medium pace.  He was born in Pointe-à-Pierre, Trinidad and Tobago. He was educated in England at Dean Close School and the Royal Agricultural College, Cirencester.

Burton made his debut for Shropshire in the 1964 Minor Counties Championship against the Somerset Second XI.  Burton played Minor counties cricket for Shropshire from 1964 to 1978, which included 113 Minor Counties Championship appearances.  He made his List A debut against Essex in the 1974 Gillette Cup.  He made 2 further List A appearances, against Yorkshire in the 1976 Gillette Cup and Surrey in the 1978 Gillette Cup.  In his 3 List A matches, he scored 53 runs at an average of 17.66, with a high score of 47.

Burton is the father of Richard Peter Lingen Burton, who is also a Shropshire county cricketer as well as National Hunt jockey.

References

External links
Robert Burton at ESPNcricinfo
Robert Burton at CricketArchive

1943 births
Living people
English sportspeople of Trinidad and Tobago descent
English cricketers
Shropshire cricketers